Derwent Barracks is an Australian Army barracks in the Hobart suburb of Glenorchy, near the Elwick Racecourse and Hobart Showgrounds. It is named after the nearby Derwent River. It is the home of several Army Reserve units including:
B Coy, 12th/40th Battalion Royal Tasmania Regiment 
6th / 13th Light Battery, 9th Regiment, Royal Australian Artillery
2nd Force Support Battalion
LSE Tasmania, 9 CSSB

Other facilities:
Joint Logistic Unit Victoria (JLUV) Hobart Detachment
Area Clothing Store
Anglesea Barracks Officers Mess (ABOM) Derwent Barracks Annex
Sergeants Mess Annex
Griffins Lair (Soldiers Club)

References

Buildings and structures in Hobart
Barracks in Australia
Military installations in Tasmania